Ankon may refer to:
Ankon (Picenum), an ancient Greek colony, now Ancona in Italy
Ankon (Pontus), an ancient settlement of Pontus, now in Turkey
Mahidul Islam Ankon (born 1999), Bangladeshi cricketer
Ikegusuku Ankon (1768–?), Ryukyuan bureaucrat